The Order of Ismoili Somoni is Tajikistan's highest distinction. It is named after Isma'il ibn Ahmad, also known as Ismoili Somoni.

Recipients

Tajiks

Public servants
 Abdulmajid Dostiev

Military
 Sherali Khayrulloyev, former Minister of Defence of Tajikistan

Politicians
 Oqil Oqilov, former Prime Minister of Tajikistan
 Yahyo Azimov, former Prime Minister of Tajikistan
 Mahmadsaid Ubaydulloyev, former Mayor of Dushanbe

Foreigners

Neighboring nations
 Asif Ali Zardari, former President of Pakistan
 Burhanuddin Rabbani, former President of Afghanistan (2021)
 Ahmad Shah Massoud, former Minister of Defense of the Islamic State of Afghanistan and head of the Northern Alliance (2021)

Post-Soviet space
 Ilham Aliyev, President of Azerbaijan
 Abdulla Aripov, Prime Minister of Uzbekistan (2018)
 Gurbanguly Berdimuhamedow, President of Turkmenistan (2010)
 Abdulaziz Kamilov, Minister of Foreign Affairs of Uzbekistan (2018)
 Nursultan Nazarbayev, President of Kazakhstan
 Vladimir Putin, President of Russia (2007)
 Viktor Yanukovych, former President of Ukraine (2011)
 Valdis Zatlers, former President of Latvia (2009)

Rest of the world
 Ban Ki-moon, former Secretary-General of the United Nations
 Ekmeleddin İhsanoğlu, former Secretary-General of the Organisation of Islamic Cooperation
 Sabah Al-Ahmad Al-Jaber Al-Sabah, former Emir of Kuwait

References

Orders, decorations, and medals of Tajikistan